Ira Terry Sayre (March 6, 1858March 6, 1926) was a Michigan politician.

Early life
Sayre was born in Hector, New York, on March 6, 1858, to parents Augustus and Sarah Evelyn Sayre. He and his family moved to Michigan in 1864. Sayre graduated from as a part of Flushing High School's first class in 1878. Sayre attended both Michigan Agricultural College and the University of Michigan Law School from 1880 to 1881, but did not graduate.

Career
Sayre served as the Flushing Township clerk for seven years. Sayre served as justice of the peace in Flushing, Michigan, from 1888 to 1892. Sayre was admitted to the bar on June 12, 1881. He then started practicing in Flushing, Michigan. After organizing the Peoples State Bank in Flushing, Michigan, and served as its first president. On November 8, 1898, Sayre was elected to the Michigan Senate where he represented the 13th district from January 1, 1899, to January 1, 1901.

Personal life
On August 5, 1884, Sayre married Julia E. Niles. Together they had three children. Sayre was a number of multiple Masonic organizations, including the Shrine.

Death
Sayre died on March 6, 1926, in Flushing, Michigan. He was interred at the Flushing City Cemetery on March 8, 1926.

References

1858 births
1926 deaths
American bank presidents
American Freemasons
American justices of the peace
Burials in Michigan
City and town clerks
Michigan lawyers
Republican Party Michigan state senators
People from Genesee County, Michigan
University of Michigan Law School alumni
19th-century American judges
19th-century American lawyers
19th-century American politicians
20th-century American politicians